Robert McConkey (11 January 1895 – 5 January 1961) was an Irish hurler. His championship career at the senior level with the Limerick county team spanned sixteen years from 1918 until 1934.

McConkey first played competitive hurling with the St Patrick's club in Limerick. He later joined the Young Irelands club and won five county senior championship medals between 1920 and 1932.

Impressive displays at the club level brought McConkey to the attention of the Limerick senior team selectors and he was quickly added to the team. Over the course of a sixteen-year period, he won three All-Ireland medals, beginning with his first in 1918, a second as captain of the team in 1921 and a third and final winners' medal in 1934. McConkey also won four Munster medals.

After being chosen on the Munster inter-provincial team for the first time in 1927, McConkey was an automatic choice on the panel for two seasons. During that time he won one Railway Cup medal.

Honours

Young Irelands
Limerick Senior Hurling Championship (5): 1920, 1922, 1928, 1930, 1932

Limerick
All-Ireland Senior Hurling Championship (3): 1918, 1921 (c), 1934
Munster Senior Hurling Championship (4): 1918, 1921 (c), 1923, 1934

Munster
Railway Cup (1): 1928

References

1895 births
1961 deaths
All-Ireland Senior Hurling Championship winners
Irish carpenters
Limerick inter-county hurlers
Munster inter-provincial hurlers
Young Irelands (Limerick) hurlers